Ken Billot is a former association football player who represented New Zealand at international level.

Billot played two official A-international matches for the New Zealand in 1980, the first as a substitute in a 4–0 win over Mexico on 20 August, the second starting in a 0–3 loss to Canada on 18 September 1980.

References

External links
 

Year of birth missing (living people)
Living people
New Zealand association footballers
New Zealand international footballers
Association football defenders
University-Mount Wellington players